Yuvaraju  is a 2000 Indian Telugu-language romantic drama film directed and produced by Y. V. S. Chowdary. The film stars Mahesh Babu, Sakshi Shivanand and Simran in lead roles. The film was a failure at the box-office.

Plot
Srinivas has just returned to India and joins a college in Hyderabad. There, he meets his classmate Srivalli, a young beautiful girl with whom he falls in love. Srivalli has a childhood friend, Vamsi abroad, whom she regards as her best friend and keeps him close to her heart as when a plane crashed 20 years back, these two are the only survivors of the tragedy.

Finally Srinivas and Srivalli learn that they are in love with each other. They break the news followed by a lavish engagement ceremony. For the placid viewers then comes the excitement in the form of Srilata, who arrives in nick of time to attend the engagement. Srivalli learns that Srinivas and Srilata know each other since they met in abroad few years ago, from the brief observation at her engagement ceremony.

Srilata has a son named Teja whom Srinivas befriends. He learns that his father does not live with them. Later during an outing he Teja plays a tune which was taught to him by his mother saying it's his father's tune. Here Srinivas learns that Teja is his son.

He goes to Srilata who tells him during an outing years back, they were given a drink by the tribals and didn't remember what happened. She remembered three months later but couldn't find him. Now he wants to tell Srivalli the truth but Srilata makes him promise on his son's photo that he won't tell anything. Teja learns the truth. Both Srinivas and Teja come close during the days. Srinivas has afterthoughts about his marriage as he wants his son. Vamsi loves Srivalli and comes to the marriage to win her.

As the marriage day emerges Srilata can't bear to see the marriage, so she tries to leave. Teja wants to see his father before leaving. Srivalli learns the truth from a letter written by Teja. Srinivas tries to stop them at airport where they learn she has taken poison. Srivalli also arrives and they take her to hospital, and are attacked by rowdies. Later, Srinivas, Srilata and their son embark a trip.

Cast

 Mahesh Babu as Srinivas / Sri
 Sakshi Sivanand as Srivalli
 Simran as Srilata
 Master Teja as Teja
 Sivaji as Sivaji
 Ali as Baba Sehgal
 Venu Madhav as Sehgal Baba
 Venkat as Vamsi
 Chandra Mohan
 Bandla Ganesh
 Varsha
 Ramya Sri as College lecturer
 AVS
 M. S. Narayana
 Baby Sridivya as Kalpana

Soundtrack
The soundtrack of this film was composed by Ramana Gogula, which was a huge hit. This album consisted of eleven tracks, including two instrumentals. The soundtrack featured eminent singers like S. P. Balasubrahmanyam, K. S. Chithra, Hariharan, Shankar Mahadevan, Udit Narayan, Sunitha Upadrashta, Anuradha Sriram, Nanditha and Ramana Gogula himself. Especially the songs "Guntalakidi", "Haira Debba", "Manesemo" and "Tholivalape" were huge hits. The lyrics were written by Veturi Sundara Rama Murthy.

Reviews
Idlebrain.com rated the film 3/5. fullhyd rated it 7/10. Telugucinema.com stated, "Movie has nothing new. An average movie".

References

External links
 

2000 films
2000s Telugu-language films
Films directed by Y. V. S. Chowdary